Percy Smith is the name of:

 F. Percy Smith (1880–1945), English naturalist and pioneer photographer
 Percy Smith (English cricketer) (1804–1876), English clergyman and cricketer
 Percy Smith (New Zealand cricketer) (1883-1932), New Zealand cricketer
 Percy Smith (ethnologist) (1840–1922), New Zealand ethnologist and surveyor
 Percy Smith (English footballer) (1880–1959), English football player and manager
 Percy Smith (Australian footballer) (1887–1974), Australian rules footballer
 Percy Smith (Australian priest), (1903–1982), Australian priest
 Percy Smith (Australian politician) (1920–2002), known as Ray, member of the Queensland Legislative Assembly
 Percy Smith (Canadian politician) (1922–2009), Canadian member of the House of Commons